Melychiopharis cynips is an ant-mimicking spider from Brazil.

It was briefly transferred from the family Araneidae to Theridiidae between 2002 and 2005, based mainly on characteristics of the male palp.

References
 Santos, A.J., Brescovit A.D. & Levi, H.W (2005). Melychiopharis: an atypical orb-weaving spider from South America (Araneae: Araneidae). Zootaxa 1016:57–64 Abstract

Araneidae
Spiders of Brazil
Spiders described in 1895